The Asian Badminton Championships 1983  took place from 1 to 8 December in Calcutta, India. Both individual competitions and men's team competition were conducted. At the end of day, China took titles from four disciplines, Men's singles, Men's doubles, Women's doubles and Men's team competitions while South Korea won Women's singles and Mixed doubles events.

Medalists

Medal table

Final results

Semifinal results

Men's team results

Semifinals 
 4 : 1 
 3 : 2

Final 
China V/s India

China conceded remaining two matches to India.

References

External links
 
 

Badminton Asia Championships
Asian Badminton Championships
1983 Badminton Asia Championships
Badminton Asia Championships
Badminton Asia Championships